Guadalcanal Diary may refer to:

Guadalcanal Diary (book), a memoir of war correspondent Richard Tregaskis, published 1 January 1943
Guadalcanal Diary (film), a 1943 20th Century Fox film adaptation of the book
Guadalcanal Diary (band), an alternative jangle pop group from Marietta, Georgia